Paul Aidoo (born 30 November 1991) is a Ghanaian footballer who plays as a midfielder for Berekum Chelsea F.C., he attended Fijai Secondary School in Sekondi Takoradi from 2002 to 2005

References

1991 births
Living people
Ghanaian footballers
Association football midfielders
Berekum Chelsea F.C. players